The Valea Roșie or Roșia ( or Remete-patak) is a river in Romania, Bihor County, right tributary of the Crișul Negru.

The river starts at the Roșia karst spring in the Pădurea Craiului Mountains. It flows through the hills of the Beiuș Depression and joins the Crișul Negru near Pocola. The most important villages on the river are Roșia, Remetea and Pocola.

Hydronymy

Valea Roșie had two Hungarian names. Originally it was called Remete-patak (referring to Remetea/Magyarremete village on its shore). That name was used until the 18th century, last time consequently in the 1720 conscription. During this century the remaining small community of Hungarians in the valley adopted the more frequently used Romanian name in the form of Rossia-patak. This name has been used since then. The older name means hermit in Hungarian.

Tributaries

The following rivers are tributaries to the Valea Roșie:
Left: Șoimuș, Sohodol, Meziad
Right: Albioara, Strâmtura (Valea Ușorilor), Drăgoteni

References

Rivers of Romania
Rivers of Bihor County